Puthenkavu Bhagavathy Temple (Malayalam:പുത്തൻകാവ് ഭഗവതീ ക്ഷേത്രം) is a
Hindu temple dedicated
to god Sree Badrakali, located
in the village of
Elavoor in Kerala
state, India. It is one of
the most important
places of worship for
Hindus of Kerala.
This Temple is famous, because of the widespread allegations all over Kerala with regard to the Elavoor Thookam.

References

Bhagavathi temples in Kerala
Durga temples
Hindu temples in Ernakulam district